Zambia competed at the 1968 Summer Olympics in Mexico City, Mexico.  Previously, the nation had competed as Northern Rhodesia.

Athletics

Men

Key
Note–Ranks given for track events are within the athlete's heat only
Q = Qualified for the next round
q = Qualified for the next round as a fastest loser or, in field events, by position without achieving the qualifying target
NR = National record
N/A = Round not applicable for the event
Bye = Athlete not required to compete in round

Boxing

Men

References
Official Olympic Reports

Nations at the 1968 Summer Olympics
1968
1968 in Zambia